Since the establishment of the competition in 1903, nine British riders have led the general classification in the Tour de France at the end of a stage during one of the 103 editions of the Tours de France. As of the end of the 2018 Tour, this equals a total of 101 stages.

History 
One of the three Grand Tours of professional road bicycle racing, the Tour de France is the most famous road cycling event in the world, and is held annually around the month of July. Although all riders compete together, the winners of the Tour are divided into classifications, each best known by the coloured jersey that is worn by the leader of it; the general classification (GC), represented by the yellow jersey (French: maillot jaune), is for the overall leader in terms of the lowest time. The other individual classifications in the Tour are the points classification, commonly seen as the sprinters' classification (green jersey), the mountains classification (polka dot jersey), and the young rider classification (white jersey).

The first British rider to wear the yellow jersey was Tom Simpson in 1962, after he finished in the leading group of riders on stage twelve from Pau to Saint-Gaudens. He lost the lead in the following stage's mountain time trial. Thirty-two years later, at the 1994 Tour, Chris Boardman won the opening prologue in Lille. He wore yellow for the next three stages until the end of the team time trial on stage three. On the sixth stage from Cherbourg to Rennes, Sean Yates then took the lead of the race, holding yellow for one stage. In 1997, Boardman again took the yellow jersey after he won the prologue in Rouen. He lost it in the following stage that, although finished in a bunch sprint, awarded a time bonus to the winner. He came back the next year to win the prologue in Dublin. He held it until stage two when he crashed out of the race. In 2000, David Millar won the opening individual time trial in Futuroscope to hold yellow until stage four's team time trial.

The next British rider to lead the general classification was Bradley Wiggins in 2012, after he placed second behind compatriot and teammate Chris Froome on stage seven's summit finish at the La Planche des Belles Filles ski station. Wiggins held the yellow jersey until the end of the Tour to become the first Briton to win the race. Froome came in second overall, and the following year went one better and won the Tour after gaining and holding the lead to the end after his victory on stage eight's mountain course from Castres to Ax 3 Domaines. After he was forced to retire due to an injury in 2014, Froome came back in 2015, and on stage three's summit finish at Huy claimed the yellow jersey, although he lost it the following day after a solo win from German rider Tony Martin. Froome took the yellow jersey back from Martin after he retired from the Tour after stage six. No rider wore yellow for the seven stage as Martin had finished the stage, so Froome held it after the seventh; he defended it until the conclusion of the race to win his second Tour. He also claimed the mountains classification, the first time a rider had won both in the same year since Eddy Merckx in 1970. In 2016, Mark Cavendish won the opening stage's bunch sprint at Utah Beach to become the seventh British rider to wear yellow. He lost the jersey after the next stage's uphill sprint finish. Froome's solo victory after the descent into Bagnères-de-Luchon saw him take the race lead, which he held to the end of the Tour and win his third title.

List 
"Obtained" refers to the date and stage where the rider secured the lead of the general classification at the finish; the rider would first wear the yellow jersey in the stage after, where he would start the day as leader. "Relinquished" refers to the date and stage where the rider lost the lead, and therefore was not wearing the yellow jersey the following stage.

See also

 List of Australian cyclists who have led the Tour de France general classification
 List of British cyclists
 List of Dutch cyclists who have led the Tour de France general classification
 Yellow jersey statistics

Notes

References

Further reading

External links

Lists of cyclists
Tour de France-related lists
Cycle racing in the United Kingdom
Tour de France general classification leaders
Tour de France people